Ten ships of the Royal Navy have borne the name HMS Forester:

 was a 22-gun ship launched in 1657 and blown up in 1672.
 was a 7-gun hoy launched in 1693 and wrecked in 1752.
 was a 4-gun hoy launched in 1748 and transferred to the coastguard as a hulk in 1828.
 was a 3-gun gunvessel, formerly a Thames sailing barge, purchased in 1794 and sold on 29 December 1801 for £210.
 was an 18-gun  launched in 1806. She was used for harbour service from 1816 and was sold in 1819.
HMS Forester was to have been a 10-gun brig. She was ordered in 1824, but the order was either cancelled in 1830, or otherwise transferred to become the next HMS Forester.
 was a 10-gun  launched in 1832, wrecked in 1833 and sold in 1843.
 was an  wooden screw gunboat launched in 1856. She was renamed YC7 as a yard craft in 1868, and was lost in a typhoon in 1871.
 was a composite screw gunboat launched in 1877. She became a coal hulk in 1894 and was sold in 1904.
 was an  launched in 1911 and sold in 1921.
 was an F-class destroyer launched in 1934. She was sold for scrapping in 1946.

Citations

Royal Navy ship names